Secret Rituals is the third studio album from Brisbane indie pop duo The Grates. It is their first album to be recorded as a duo, with longtime drummer Alana Skyring having left the band to pursue a culinary career.

The first song to be released to radio as a single was "Turn Me On", which was first played on Triple J on 29 April 2011.

The band made the entire album available to stream via their website  along with accompanying videos that were made for each track which were shot and edited  by The Grates themselves.

Track listing

Charts

References

2011 albums
The Grates albums
Dew Process albums
Albums produced by Gus van Go